Amores que engañan is a Mexican anthology television series produced by Casablanca, Yahayra Films and VIP 2000 TV for Lifetime Latin America. The series premiered on 14 May 2022. In December 2022, the series was renewed for a second season.

Each episode stars different actors and tell the stories of women who face everyday situations including psychological and verbal violence, betrayal and heartbreak, obsession and passion and infidelity.

Notable guest stars 

 Marjorie de Sousa
 Carlos Ponce
 Christian Vázquez
 Grettell Valdez
 Francisco Gattorno
 Héctor Suárez Gomís
 Aylín Mújica
 Lupita Ferrer
 Ivonne Montero
 Pepe Gámez
 Erika de la Rosa
 Gabriel Porras
 Juan Pablo Llano
 Mark Tacher
 Sofía Sylwin
 Leonardo Daniel
 Verónica Montes
 Ignacio Casano
 Gabriela Vergara
 Ana Patricia Rojo
 Omar Fierro
 Víctor Cámara
 Jorge Salinas
 Scarlet Ortiz
 Sophia Abrahão
 Duda Nagle
 Julia Gama

 Gabriela Spanic
 Sergio Basáñez
 Marlene Favela 
 Helena Rojo
 Yul Bürkle
 Cristián de la Fuente 
 Luciano D'Alessandro
 Laura Flores
 Elizabeth Gutiérrez
 Juan Soler
 Alejandra Espinoza
 Pedro Moreno

Episodes

Production 
Filming of Amores que engañan began in January 2022. Filming took place in the United States, Mexico, and São Paulo, Brazil. A total of ten episodes have been confirmed for the first season. On 16 December 2022, the series was renewed for a second season. Filming of the second season began on 16 January 2023 in Guadalajara, México. On 24 January 2022, a list of guest stars for the second season was announced and that the season had received an order of 12 episodes.

Reception

Awards and nominations

References

External links 
 

2022 Mexican television series debuts
2020s Mexican television series
Spanish-language television shows